August Friedrich Gustav Werther (1 August 1815, Roßla – 29 June 1869, Königsberg) was a German chemist. He made contributions in both organic and inorganic chemistry, being known for his work in the field of analytical chemistry.

Education 
In 1843, Werther obtained his doctorate in Berlin, where he served as an amanuensis to Eilhard Mitscherlich.

Career 
Werther was a chemistry instructor at the artillery and engineering school in Berlin. In 1853, Werther became an associate professor at the University of Königsberg, where in 1859 he was appointed a full professor of chemistry.

Published works 
From 1853 onward, he was an editor of Otto Linné Erdmann's Journal für practische Chemie. The following are some of Werther's principal works:
 De tartratibus nonnullis atque uvariatibus (1843).
 Die unorganische Chemie (1850/52) 2 divisions – Inorganic chemistry.
 Praktisches Handbuch bei dem Bau Eiserner Träger (1853).
 Die unorganische Chemie ein Grundriss für seine Vorlesungen, (1863) – Inorganic chemistry; an outline for lectures.
 Ueber eine Verbindung von Schwefel, Nickel und Wismuth – On the linking of sulfur, nickel and bismuth.

References 

1815 births
1869 deaths
People from Mansfeld-Südharz
Academic staff of the University of Königsberg
19th-century  German chemists
Amanuenses